Marcel Duchamp was a French American artist whose work is most often associated with the Dadaist and Surrealist movements.

Duchamp may also refer to:
 Duchamp (clothing), a London-based luxury clothing company
 Duchamp (surname), a surname